The Girl Who Came Back  is a 1923 American silent drama film directed by Tom Forman and starring Miriam Cooper, Gaston Glass and Kenneth Harlan.

Cast
 Miriam Cooper as Sheila
 Gaston Glass as Ray Underhill
 Kenneth Harlan as Martin Norries
 Fred Malatesta as Ramon Valhays
 Joseph J. Dowling as Old 565 
 Ethel Shannon as Belle Bryant
 Mary Culver as Mayme Miller
 Zasu Pitts as Anastasia Muldoon

References

Bibliography
 Connelly, Robert B. The Silents: Silent Feature Films, 1910-36, Volume 40, Issue 2. December Press, 1998.
 Munden, Kenneth White. The American Film Institute Catalog of Motion Pictures Produced in the United States, Part 1. University of California Press, 1997.

External links
 
 

1923 films
1923 drama films
1920s English-language films
American silent feature films
Silent American drama films
Films directed by Tom Forman
American black-and-white films
Preferred Pictures films
1920s American films